Enric Cuxart Vaquer (born 27 March 1967) is a former Spanish footballer who played as a forward.

Career
Born in Cornellà de Llobregat, Catalonia, Cuxart began his career with hometown club Cornellà. In 1987, Cuxart signed for Valencia's reserve team, Mestalla. On 6 May 1990, Cuxart scored a 14-minute hat-trick on his second appearance for Valencia, in a 4–0 win against Logroñés. In 1991, Cuxart signed for Espanyol. After 13 appearances and three goals, Cuxart signed for Segunda División B side Las Palmas in 1993. After a short stint at Las Palmas, Cuxart signed for Córdoba, before signing for Cartagena in 1994. In early 1995, Cuxart signed for Elche. Cuxart scored 42 league goals in 84 games for Elche, before signing for CD Badajoz in 1997. In 1998, Cuxart joined Real Murcia, playing for the club for two seasons before his retirement.

References

1967 births
Living people
Spanish footballers
Footballers from Catalonia
People from Cornellà de Llobregat
Sportspeople from the Province of Barcelona
Association football forwards
UE Cornellà players
Valencia CF Mestalla footballers
Valencia CF players
RCD Espanyol footballers
UD Las Palmas players
Córdoba CF players
Cartagena FC players
Elche CF players
CD Badajoz players
Real Murcia players
La Liga players
Segunda División players
Segunda División B players